KSNL may refer to:

 KSNL-LD, a low-power television station (channel 23, virtual 6) licensed to Salina, Kansas, United States
 Shawnee Regional Airport, in Shawnee, Oklahoma (ICAO code KSNL)